Anna Ólafsdóttir (2 September 1932  – 21 January 2013) was an Icelandic swimmer. She competed in the women's 200 metre breaststroke at the 1948 Summer Olympics and was the first woman to represent Iceland at the Olympics. During her athletic career, she set several national records in swimming.

References

External links
 

1932 births
Living people
Anna Olafsdottir
Swimmers at the 1948 Summer Olympics
Place of birth missing (living people)
Icelandic female breaststroke swimmers